Labeo stolizkae is a species of freshwater ray-finned fish frpm the cyprinid genus Labeo which has only been recorded from the Irrawaddy and Salween Rivers in Myanmar.

References 

Labeo
Fish described in 1870